George Martin Birmingham (born 3 August 1954) is an Irish judge who has served as President of the Court of Appeal since April 2018 and a Judge of the Court of Appeal since October 2014. He previously served as a judge of the High Court from 2007 to 2014. He served as a Teachta Dála (TD) for the Dublin North-Central constituency from 1981 to 1989 and as a Minister of State from 1982 to 1987.

Early life
Birmingham was born in Dublin in 1954. He was educated at St. Paul's College, Trinity College Dublin and King's Inns, where he qualified as a barrister. He was called to the bar in November 1976.

His early legal career involved representing clients in commercial, criminal, and labour law matters.

Political career

First elections
Birmingham was elected to the national executive of Fine Gael in December 1976. He proposed a successful motion at the 1978 Fine Gael Ardfheis for the party to seek a referendum on divorce. He was first elected to office in 1979, topping the poll in his ward to become a Fine Gael member of Dublin Corporation for Raheny. He was first elected to Dáil Éireann at the 1981 general election as a Fine Gael TD for the Dublin North-Central constituency. He was competing against Charles Haughey, Vincent Brady and Noël Browne. He was the Fine Gael spokesperson for urban affairs in 1982.

Minister of State
Between 1982 and 1987, he served as a Minister of State under Taoiseach Garret FitzGerald. In December 1982 he was appointed as Minister of State at the Department of Labour with responsibility for youth affairs, with additional duties as Minister of State at the Department of Education with responsibility for Co-ordination of Education and Training from December 1983.

In 1983, in the Dáil, he defended the wording of the then proposed Eighth Amendment of the Constitution of Ireland on behalf of the government, specifically to ensure that the Supreme Court of Ireland could not discover an unenumerated right to abortion.

In February 1986, he was appointed as Minister of State at the Department of Foreign Affairs with special responsibility for European Affairs and Development Co-operation. He was succeeded as Minister of State for Youth Affairs by Enda Kenny. The government had considered creating a cabinet-level rank of Minister for European Affairs for Gemma Hussey to coordinate EEC affairs, but instead opted to appoint Birmingham to a Minister of State position, becoming the first Minister of State for European Affairs. Some EEC business was delegated by the Minister for Foreign Affairs to Birmingham. He travelled to Lusaka later that year for discussions with the African National Congress.

Return to opposition
At the 1987 general election, Birmingham was re-elected to the Dáil despite he and constituency colleague Richard Bruton together polling only achieving 24% of the vote combined. Fine Gael lost office, and Birmingham was appointed party spokesperson for Labour by Alan Dukes in 1987 and subsequently Education in 1988. He proposed that injunctions restraining strikes should be not be held  and that unofficial strikes should be banned. In March 1988, he introduced the Statute of Limitations (Amendment) Bill 1988, an unsuccessful private members' bill, into the Dáil, to change the time limits for personal injuries.

Birmingham lost his Dáil seat at the 1989 general election.

Legal career
He resumed his career as a barrister in 1989, becoming a Senior Counsel in 1999. He practised extensively in criminal law, prosecuting on behalf of the Director of Public Prosecutions. He represented injured fans in relation to the Lansdowne Road football riot. He appeared for the DPP in the trials of Michael McKevitt in the Special Criminal Court in 2003 and Linda and Charlotte Mulhall in 2006.

He served as chairperson of the Censorship of Publications Appeals Board. He was appointed to chair the Advisory Group on Criminal Law and Procedure in 1996 by Minister for Justice Nora Owen.

Birmingham was the sole member of the Commission of Investigation into the Dean Lyons case. He conducted a preliminary investigation for the government prior to the Ferns Report into allegations of clerical sex abuse in the Roman Catholic Diocese of Ferns.

Judicial career
On 3 May 2007, it was announced that he had been selected to become a High Court judge. He became a Judge of the High Court in June 2007.

In October 2014, he became one of the first appointees as Judge of the Court of Appeal on its establishment.

President of Court of Appeal
On 24 April 2018, the Government of Ireland nominated Birmingham to be President of the Court of Appeal. As President of the Court of Appeal, he is an ex officio member of the Supreme Court.

Birmingham's nomination attracted political controversy, in light of his time as a Fine Gael TD and Minister of State during the 1980s.

In 2018, he noted the difficulty posed to the court in not having enough judges to hear appeals. There was a change in legislation in 2019 to increase the number of judges in order to speed up the appellate process, increasing the number of Court of Appeal judges to fifteen.

References

1954 births
Living people
Fine Gael TDs
Politicians from County Dublin
Members of the 22nd Dáil
Members of the 23rd Dáil
Members of the 24th Dáil
Members of the 25th Dáil
Ministers of State of the 24th Dáil
High Court judges (Ireland)
Irish barristers
Alumni of Trinity College Dublin
Presidents of the Court of Appeal (Ireland)
Alumni of King's Inns